Team ZA Roller Derby represents South Africa in women's international roller derby, in events such as the Roller Derby World Cup.

History
The team was first formed to compete at the 2014 Roller Derby World Cup, at which it was known as Team South Africa Roller Derby.  It played a warm-up mixed scrimmage against the Texas Rollergirls, but lost all of its group stage matches and exited the competition.

At the 2018 Roller Derby World Cup, on the first day, the team lost narrowly to Greece, and then by 283 to nil to England. However, it then beat Romania and Costa Rica, recording its first ever wins in the tournament.  It finished the tournament ranked 35 out of 38 teams.

Squad

2014

2018

References

ZA
Roller derby
Roller derby in South Africa
2014 establishments in South Africa
Sports clubs established in 2014